The Apertura 2009 season (officially known as Torneo Apertura  2009) was the twenty-third tournament of the Primera División de Fútbol Profesional since its establishment of an Apertura and Clausura format. FAS won the tournament for the 17th time in history, defeating Águila in the finale with a 3–2 victory in extra time. Isidro Metapán were the defending champions, having won their 3rd title the previous season and being the back to back champions. A total of 10 teams contested the league, with none getting relegated (relegation only occurs on Clausuras). The season began on August 14, 2009 and concluded on December 20, 2009. The 10 teams of the Primera División played 18 matches, playing each team twice (home and away). The top four teams qualified directly to the semifinals. Since Vista Hermosa and Isidro Metapán finished with the same points at the end of the regular season, a knockout playoff match was played to determine the last team to advance to the playoffs. Vista Hermosa clinched the final spot for the playoffs with a 1–0 victory over Isidro Metapán.

Promotion and Relegation
Promoted from Segunda División de Fútbol Salvadoreño.
 Champions: Atlético Marte
 Municipal Limeño (bought the spot of Chalatenango).

Relegated to Segunda División de Fútbol Salvadoreño.
 Last place: Juventud Independiente
Chalatenango (sold their spot to Municipal Limeño).

Team information

Stadia and locations

Team information

Personnel and sponsoring

League table

Results

Managerial changes

Before the start of the season

Regular season

Playoffs

Semi-finals

First leg

Second leg

Final

Top-ten goalscorers

List of foreign players in the league
This is a list of foreign players in Apertura 2009. The following players:
have played at least one apetura game for the respective club.
have not been capped for the El Salvador national football team on any level, independently from the birthplace

A new rule was introduced this season that clubs can only have three foreign players per club and can only add a new player if there is an injury or player/s is released.

C.D. Águila
  Hermes Martínez
  Arturo Albarrán
  Nicholas Addlery 

Alianza F.C.
  Elder Figueroa
  Juliano de Andrade
  Alberto Zapata 
  Francisco Portillo

Atlético Marte
  José Luis Osorio
  Wilson Sánchez
  Luis Escriba

Atlético Balboa
  Alcides Bandera
  Luis Asprilla
  Juan Carlos Reyes

C.D. FAS
  Roberto Peña
  Alejandro Bentos
  Franklin Webster

 (player released mid season)
 Injury replacement player

C.D. Luis Ángel Firpo
  Mario Benítez
  Edgar Leguizamón
  Leandro Franco

A.D. Isidro Metapán
  Anel Canales
  Ernesto Aquino
  Gustavo Méndes

Nejapa F.C.
  Erick Corrales
  Luis Espindola
  Andrés Aguirre

Municipal Limeño
  José Oliveira
  Sergio Álvarez 
  Garrick Gordon
  Gabriel Garcete

Vista Hermosa
  Nicolás Muñoz
  Leonardo Da Silva
  Ceveriano Palominos
  Jean Franco Carreño

Notes

External links
 First Division League Stats 

Primera División de Fútbol Profesional Apertura seasons
El
1